Little Chiques Creek (formerly known as Little Chickies Creek) is a  tributary of Chiques Creek in Lancaster County, Pennsylvania in the United States.

See also
List of rivers of Pennsylvania

References

Rivers of Pennsylvania
Tributaries of the Susquehanna River
Rivers of Lancaster County, Pennsylvania